Parham may refer to:

People 
 Parham (surname), a surname of Anglo-Saxon English origin

Places

Antigua and Barbuda 
 Parham, Antigua and Barbuda, that claims to be the oldest town on Antigua
 Parham Peninsula

Australia 
 Parham, South Australia, also known as Port Parham

Canada 
 Parham, Ontario

England 
 Parham, Suffolk
 Parham Airfield Museum
 Parham, West Sussex
 Parham Park, the area surrounding Parham House

United States 
 Parham, Mississippi

Other
 Parham Attack, an unusual chess opening